The 1950 Pepperdine Waves football team represented George Pepperdine College as a member of the California Collegiate Athletic Association (CCAA) during the 1950 college football season. The team was led by second-year head coach Ray Richards and played home games at Gilmore Stadium in Los Angeles. They finished the season with an overall record of 4–5 and a mark of 2–2 in conference play, placing third in the CCAA.

Schedule

Notes

References

Pepperdine
Pepperdine Waves football seasons
Pepperdine Waves football